Michele Pietranera (born July 29, 1974 in Parma) is an Italian professional football player currently playing for Crociati Noceto.

He played 7 games in the Serie A in the 1993/94 season for A.C. Reggiana 1919.

External links
 

1974 births
Living people
Italian footballers
Serie A players
Serie B players
A.C. Reggiana 1919 players
Cosenza Calcio 1914 players
A.C. Monza players
Ravenna F.C. players
Modena F.C. players
Calcio Foggia 1920 players
Catania S.S.D. players
Calcio Padova players
A.S.D. Victor San Marino players
F.C. Pavia players
Rovigo Calcio players
Association football forwards